Jalabe or Jalabi may refer to:
 Ahmad Chalabi, sometimes transcribed as Ahmad al-Jalabi  (1944–2015), Iraqi politician
 Ahmad Effendi Jalabi mayor of Haifa in 1878–1881
 Jalabe people of Nigeria, who speak the Jalaa language
 Jalabi, Iran
 Jalebi, a sweet popular in countries of South Asia, the West Asia, North Africa